This is a list of Estonian television related events from 1982.

Events

Debuts

Television shows

Ending this year

Births
28 January - Mirtel Pohla, actress 
17 June - Ursula Ratasepp, actress
29 June - Ott Sepp, actor, singer, writer & TV host

Deaths